K. Yerragonda is a village in Y. Ramavaram Mandal, East Godavari district in the state of Andhra Pradesh in India. It is located 82km from Kakinada and 428km from State capital Hyderabad.

Demographics 
 India census, This Village had a population of 243, out of which 127 were male and 116 were female. Population of children below 6 years of age were 13%. The literacy rate of the village is 42%.

References 

Villages in Y. Ramavaram mandal